Western Oregon is a geographical term that is generally taken to mean the part of the U.S. state of Oregon within  of the Oregon Coast, on the west side of the crest of the Cascade Range. The term is applied somewhat loosely, however, and is sometimes taken to exclude the southwestern areas of the state, which are often referred to as "Southern Oregon". In that case, "Western Oregon" means only the counties west of the Cascades and north of and including Lane County.

Western Oregon, being  in area, is about the same size as New England minus Maine. Unlike the climate of Eastern Oregon, which is primarily dry and continental, the climate of Western Oregon is generally a moderate Mediterranean climate.

See also
 Northwest Oregon

References

Regions of Oregon